Evelyn Simpson may refer to:
 Evelyn Simpson Curenton (born 1953), American composer, pianist, organist, and vocalist
 Evelyn M. Simpson (1885 – 1963), English literary critic and scholar

See also 
 Simpson (name)